Al-Amwaj Al-Mosuli Sport Club, is an Iraqi football team based in Mosul, that plays in Iraq Division Two.

Managerial history
 Ali Hilal

See also 
 2020–21 Iraq FA Cup

References

External links
 Al-Amwaj Al-Mosuli SC on Goalzz.com

2017 establishments in Iraq
Association football clubs established in 2017
Football clubs in Nineveh